Kazuo Katsuramoto (born September 5, 1934) is a retired Japanese freestyle wrestler. In 1954 he won the −79 kg event at the Asian Games and finished third at the world championships. He shared fifth place at the 1956 Summer Olympics.

References

External links 
 

1934 births
Living people
Olympic wrestlers of Japan
Wrestlers at the 1956 Summer Olympics
Japanese male sport wrestlers
Asian Games medalists in wrestling
Wrestlers at the 1954 Asian Games
World Wrestling Championships medalists
Asian Games gold medalists for Japan
Medalists at the 1954 Asian Games
20th-century Japanese people